Raymond Zembri (born 26 December 1948) is a French long-distance runner. He competed in the men's 5000 metres at the 1972 Summer Olympics.

References

1948 births
Living people
Athletes (track and field) at the 1972 Summer Olympics
French male long-distance runners
Olympic athletes of France